Raymond Joseph Marie Le Bourdon (18 March 1861 – 22 September 1937) was an ex-minister of state for Monaco. He served between 1919 and 1923. He was born in 1861 and died in 1937.

See also
Ministers of State of Monaco

References

Ministers of State of Monaco
1937 deaths
1861 births
Grand Crosses of the Order of Saint-Charles